A longa is a Turkish / Eastern European dance, that was later introduced into Arabic music and is often performed at the end of a muwashshah.

It generally uses an iqa' equivalent to 2/4, with several sections called khanat (singular khana), each followed by a taslim (refrain). The last khana is generally in 3/4.

A common form of longa is longa Riad in Nahawand scale (لونجا نهاوند) which is composed by the Egyptian composer Riad Al Sunbati in the maqam Nahawand.

See also
Syrtos
Fasıl
Pop-folk

External links
Longa page

Arabic music
Middle Eastern music
Forms of Ottoman classical music
Forms of Turkish makam music